Penia is an unincorporated community in Crisp County, in the U.S. state of Georgia.

History
Variant names are "Pina" and "Pinia". The name is indicative of the many pine trees at the original town site. A post office called Pinia was established in 1890, and remained in operation until 1908.

References

Unincorporated communities in Crisp County, Georgia
Unincorporated communities in Georgia (U.S. state)